Ximenia americana, commonly known as tallow wood, hog plum, yellow plum, sea lemon, or pi'ut (Chamorro), is bush-forming shrub/small tree; a species from the Ximenia genus in the Olacaceae family. It is mainly found in the tropics, ranging from Africa, India and southeast Asia, to Australia, New Zealand, Pacific Islands, West Indies, Central, North and South America. It is especially common in Africa and South America. It is not domesticated so it is only found occurring in the wild.

They grow in areas with more than 500 mm of mean annual rainfall and up to heights of 2000 m. It is commonly found in a variety of diverse habitats ranging from dry woodlands, hilly areas to coastal bushlands, along riverbanks, and mangroves They are commonly found in poor and dry soil types. The plant has not been domesticated, so it only occurs in the wild.

Description

Tree 

The trunk has a diameter of less than 10 cm (4 in); the bark has a colour of dark brown to pale gray. The branches form an arch downwards and the branchlets have straight, thin spines that are 1 cm long, protruding out of it, and are coloured purple-red with a waxy bloom.

Leaves 
Leaves are simple, alternate or clustered on spur shoots, having a lanceolate (spear-like) to elliptic (oval) shape, are either obtuse, emarginate or retuse at the apex, and have a texture similar to leather. The leaves grow up to 2.5 to 8 cm (1 to 3 in) long and 1 to 4 cm (0.4 to 1.6 in) wide, have a thickness ranging from thin to semisucculent and have 3 to 7 pairs of lateral veins that are difficult to observe on both sides of the leaf. They curve upwards along the midrib.

Leaves are hairy as they first start growing, but become smooth and shiny as they mature. The petioles are short and thin, growing up to 3 to 6 mm (0.1 to 0.3 in) long. They are canaliculated, smooth and have a grey-green or bright green colour and flesh that is either leathery or thin. They release a strong smell like almonds when crushed.

Flowers and fruit 
Flowering is commonly observed during dry seasons. The flowers are fragrant, small, coloured white, yellow-green or pink and are about 5 to 10 mm (0.2 to 0.4 in) long. They grow on branched inflorescences, which are either pedunculate racemose or umbelliform cymes, that are on pedicles 3-7mm long. Fruits are shaped globose, subglobose, drupaceous or ellipisoid, grow up to 3 cm long, have a diameter of 2.5 cm and are smooth.

The trees produce fruit after about 3 years of growing. Young fruits are green but turn golden-yellow or yellow (and rarely orangish-red) as they ripen, climatic conditions do not affect their maturation. When ripe, the fruit has a green, juicy pulp, and one large endospermic seed, that has a small embryo and thin testa. The seed is woody and coloured light-yellow and grows up to 1.5 cm long with a diameter of 1.2 cm, and has about 60% oil content. The fruit is "refreshing" when eaten and is said to have "an almond-acid taste".  The seeds are then dispersed by animals that eat the fruit.

Ximenia americana is similar to the plant Ximenia caffra, another species in the Ximenia family. However, X. americana's leaves and fruits are smaller than X. caffra's making it easy to distinguish between the two. X. americana also bears several flowers on inflorescences that are branched whereas the flowers in X. caffra are borne in tufts or singularly, marking another difference between both of these species.

Phytochemistry 
Fatty acids and glycerides are abundantly available in X.americana. Further classes of chemical compounds found in X. americana includes alkaloids, anthraquinones, cardiac glycosides, flavonoids, glycosides, phenolic compounds, phlobatannins, quinones, saponins, tannins, and terpenoids. Leaves collected from X. americana in southern Niger were found to be rich in calcium, iron, magnesium, and manganese content but were also noted to be lacking protein. Linolenate was also detected in the leaves, along with high levels of palmitate.

Hydrocyanic acid was identified in the fruit along with high levels of vitamin C content, of which the green ones had 74% more vitamin C than the matured, yellow ones. The seed of the fruit contains cyanide derivatives and high levels of riproximin were noted in the fruit kernels. The seed oil was observed to contain the compounds ximenic, linolenic, linoleic, and stearic acids along with smaller amounts of lumequic, ximenynic acid, arachidonic, erucic, and nervonic acids and a variety of other compounds. The volatile oil of the leaves were observed to be consisted of benzaldehyde (63.5%), hydroxybenzyl cyanide (13%) and isophorone (3.5%), the cyanide content contributes to the aforementioned almond-like smell of leaves.

Taxonomy 

Jean Baptiste Christophore Fusée Aublet published occurrences of Heymassoli inermis and Heymassoli spinosa in Histoire des Plantes de la Guiane Françoise in 1775, which were then later identified as X. americana. The latter, Heymassoli spinosa, became the basionym for Ximenia spinosa which was published in A Botanical nomenclator : containing a systematical arrangement of the classes, orders, genera, and species of plants as described in the new edition of Linnæsus's Systema naturæ, by Dr. Gmelin by William Jr. Forsyth in 1794.

Ximenia americana belongs to the Ximenia genus, along with 7 other species, that all belong to the Olacaceae family. The term Ximenia comes from the Spanish priest, Francisco Ximenez, who detailed a collection of plants found in Mexico in the 17th century. The species name, americana, meaning "of America", is an indication of where the plant had been 'first' collected.

Common names of the plant include "seaside plum", "small sourplum", "wild plum", "blue sour plum", "hog plum", "sour plum", "false sandalwood", "tallow nut", "tallow wood", "wild olivein", and "wild lime" in English. "chabbuli" and "ysada" in west Africa, "ghène", "n'ghani" and "léaman" in Ivory Coast and "kleinsuurpruim", "inkoy", "mutente", "kol", "mulebe", "mungomba", "musongwasongwa", "mulutulwa", "museka", "ntogé", "nogbé", "séno", "séné", "madarud", and "madarau", in other regions in Africa. "ameixa-da-terra", "ameixa", "ameixeira-do-Brasil", ameixa-brava", "ameixa-da-Baía", "ameixa-de-espinho", "ameixa-do-Pará", "ameixeira-do-Pará", and "muirapuama" in Brazil, "hicaco", "espino de brujo", "ciruelillo", "caimito de monte", "cagalero", "albaricoque", "albaria", "tigrito", and "almendro de costa" in Spanish and "citron de mer", "cerise de mer", "croc", "macaby", and "prunier de mer" in French.

Distribution and habitat 
It is found in many habitats, predominantly in semi-arid bushlands and in dry and moist woodlands, sandy open woodlands, dry hilly areas, coastal bushlands, countrysides, shrub savannahs, forest lands and along watercourses such as riverbanks and stony slopes. X. americana occurs in altitudes up to 2000 m (6562 ft) and where mean annual rainfall is more than 500 mm. It grows on many soil types such as clay soils, clay muddy, silt sandy; however, it is mostly observed growing on poor and dry soil. It can also absorb nutrients and water from other plant species through its roots, however, it does not use this method as its mode of survival.

Ecology 
Ximenia americana is a long-lived perennial and is found present in savannahs, one of their natural habitats, and are vital food sources for animals living in the same habitats, namely mammals like giraffes, who depend on the leaves of X. americana for its food. The leaves are also eaten by insects, such as butterflies, and their larvae, documented species being Axiocerses amanga (the bush scarlet), Stugeta bowkeri (the Bowker's sapphire) and Hypolycaena philippus (the purple-brown hairstreak). The vibrant colours of the fruit, which is oftentimes produced in large amounts during the early summer, attracts birds, such as bulbuls, starlings, and barbets, and other wildlife to feed on the fruit.

The flowers are known attract many insect pollinators, namely bees. Documented bees include Agapostemon splendens (the brown-winged striped-sweat bee), Apis mellifera (the western honey bee), Augochloropsis sumptuosa, Coelioxys germana, Dialictus placidensis, Megachile mendica (the Flat-tailed Leaf-cutter Bee) and Melissodes communis (the common long-horned bee).

Ximenia americana can be classified as a facultative hemiparasite, due to its tendency to live off the roots of other nearby host species, but not as a way of survival as it can perfectly grow without a host. Due to this it can grow better in soil where it can come into contact with the roots of other plants. It can also attach to objects such as plastic or rocks.

Conservation 
The IUCN red-list declared Ximenia americana as a "Least Concern" plant. This is mainly due to the wide distribution and large population of X. americana all over the world. No major threats have been identified to the species currently and in the future. This assessment was carried out by the IUCN SSC Global Tree Specialist Group and the Botanic Gardens Conservation International (BGCI) in 2018.

However, researchers in Ethiopia have noticed the plant becoming rare in their respective study areas, mainly due to the overuse of the plant and its components. They have suggested the rehabilitation of the plants, mainly by domestication, in hopes of conserving the species in those specific areas.

Cultivation 
There have been no recorded cases of the domestication of X. americana. However, it is noted that Ximenia americana can easily propagated by planting fresh seeds in a mixture of 5 parts soil and 1 part compost. Germination is usually observed 14 to 30 days after the seed has been planted. The plant grows about 0.5 m (1.6 ft) every year, a moderate growth rate. It can grow on loamy, clay soil, and other types of poor and dry soil and is adaptable to changes in soil pH. It is drought-resistant, making it a good source of food during dry periods. It is also tolerant of mild flooding, that occur during storms or floods, for short periods of time. It is also mildly tolerant of salty soil types and salt sprays and winds. Due to the semiparasitic roots, it grows well around other plants and is best grown next a host like oak.

Toxicity 
Leaves at 100 ppm were noted to be fatal for the freshwater snail, Bulinus globus, the species responsible for causing the disease schistosomiasis. Researchers noted that X. americana extract had no deaths when the toxic effects of the extract of the plant for 14 days, however, after an oral administration of 2000 mg.kg−1, forced breathing and analgesia in the animals were noted. Another study was conducted on the effects of the liquid extracts of the root, stem and leaves of X. americana on the blood and the liver, and damage to the cells of the liver were noted.

Uses

Food 
Ximenia americana can be utilized as a food source, mainly its fruit, which can be eaten raw or pickled, and can be used to replace lemon in fish recipes, make juice, jams or intoxicating drinks; In South Africa, a kind of beer is made from the fruits. The kernel of the fruit can be made into oil, which is used in cooking as a substitute for butter or ghee. The nuts have a strong purgative effect, and should not be eaten in large amounts. In Asia, the young leaves are cooked as a vegetable. However, the leaves also contain cyanide and need to be thoroughly cooked, and should not be eaten in large amounts.

Cosmetics 
The seed of X. americanas fruit can be crushed to produce oil. This oil (ximenyinc acid) is then for a variety of cosmetic purposes such as emollients, conditioners, skin softeners, body and hair oils, as well as ingredients in soaps, lipsticks and lubricants.

Essential oils can also be obtained from the heartwood and flowers from X. americana, which are then used for fumigations and as a substitute for orange blossom respectively.

Fuel 
The wood is used as firewood and charcoal. X. americanas seed oil can be used as a potential biofuel when blended with kerosene.

Traditional medicinal 
Ximenia americana has been reported to be used to treat a large number of diseases, including measles, malaria, skin infections, sexually transmitted diseases, diarrhea, muscle cramps and lung abscesses. The leaves and twigs are used as a treatment for colds and fevers, as laxatives and an eye lotion, and as a mouthwash to prevent toothaches and throat infections. However, traditional healers reported excess salivation as a sign of the toxicity when used to treat oral diseases. The leaves are used to treat headaches, angina and as are used as an antidote to poisons. The roots of X. americana are used as a treatment multitude of diseases such as skin problems, headaches, leprosy, hemorrhoids, sexually transmitted diseases, sleeping sicknesses and guinea worms. The bark, usually used in powdered or decocted form, is used to treat skin ulcers, placed on the head for headaches, and placed in bath water for sick babies. The fruit is eaten in excess to treat any cases of vermifuge and constipation. =X. americanas extracts from bark, roots and leaves have been reported to be used to treat urinary tract infections, inflammation, burning, gastritis and cancer. The main ways these parts of X. americana are prepared are either by infusion, decoction, syrup, cataplasm, and/or tincture.

Crude drug 
Xymelys 45 is a drug containing X. americana bark extract that is marketed as a cosmetic to provide protection for ultrasensitive skin, oxidative stress and free radicals. X. americana tea has been marketed in Brazil to externally heal wounds and ulcers and internally heal heart and kidney problems; the X. americana tea is just the bark vegetal powder. The seed oil is marketed as a treatment for dry skin conditions, in moisturisers, emollients, and anti-ageing and anti-acne products, and as a treatment for fragile and damaged hair.

Horticulture 
The species is also used as a border and boundary, if it is cultivated as a hedge plant properly. The plant can also be used for decoration purposes as it has attractive flowers and foliage.

References

External links 

Olacaceae
Trees of Africa
Flora of tropical Asia
Flora of the Pacific
Afrotropical realm flora
Indomalayan realm flora
Oceanian realm flora
Flora of Queensland
Flora of the Coral Sea Islands Territory
Plants described in 1753
Taxa named by Carl Linnaeus
Bushfood
Fruits originating in Africa
Medicinal plants
Pantropical flora